21 Hours at Munich is a 1976 American historical drama television film directed by William A. Graham and starring William Holden, Shirley Knight and Franco Nero. It is based on the 1975 non-fiction book The Blood of Israel by Serge Groussard, and it deals with real events concerning the Munich massacre during the 1972 Summer Olympics.  It was broadcast by ABC November 7, 1976. Despite its TV origin, the film was released theatrically in several foreign countries. It has been nominated for 2 Primetime Emmys.

Plot
A dramatization of the incident in 1972 when Arab terrorists broke into the Olympic compound in Munich and murdered 11 Israeli athletes.

Cast
 William Holden as Chief of Police Manfred Schreiber
 Shirley Knight as Anneliese Graes
 Franco Nero as Issa
 Anthony Quayle as General Zvi Zamir
 Richard Basehart as Chancellor Willy Brandt
 Noel Willman as Interior Minister Bruno Merk
 Georg Marischka as Genscher
 Else Quecke as Golda Meir 
 Michael Degen as Mohammed Khadif 
 Djamchid 'Jam' Sohaili as Touny (as Djamchid Socheili)
 Walter Kohut as Feldhaus
 Jan Niklas as Schreiber's Aide
 Ernest Lenart as Ben Horin
 Osman Raghab as Prime Minister Aziz Sedky
 James Hurley as Avery Brundage 
 Franz Rudnick as Troger 
 Heinz Feldhaus Brandt's Aide 
 Martin Gilet as Weinberger 
 Paul L. Smith as Gutfreund (as Paul Smith)
 Güther Maria Halmer as Spitzer (as Guther Halmer)
 David Hess as Berger
 Eric Falk as Romano (as Erik Falk)
 Bernhard Melcer as Slavin
 Herbert Fux as Shorr 
 Eppaminodas Sodukos as Shapira (as Epamonodas Sdukos)
 Wilfried von Aacken as Springer (as Wilfried von Aacken)
 Abraham Gabison as Halfin
 Ullrich Haupt as Israeli Coach (as Ullrich Haupt)
 Dan van Husen as Tony (as Dan Van Husen)
 Achim Geisler as Abu Halla (as Joachim Geisler)
 Reto Feurer as Salah 
 Julio Pinheiro as Paulo 
 Franz Gunther Heider as Samir 
 Sammy Kazian as Denawi
 Carmelo Ceslo as Badran

See also
 List of American films of 1976

References

External links

1976 television films
1976 films
1976 drama films
1970s American films
1970s English-language films
1970s historical drama films
ABC network original films
American drama television films
American films based on actual events
American historical drama films
Drama films based on actual events
Films about terrorism in Europe
Films about hostage takings
Films about the 1972 Summer Olympics
Films based on non-fiction books
Films directed by William Graham (director)
Films scored by Laurence Rosenthal
Films set in Munich
Films set in West Germany
Filmways films
Historical television films
Munich massacre
Television films based on actual events
Television films based on books